"Campaign" is a song written and performed by American singer Ty Dolla $ign featuring fellow American rapper Future. Produced by D.R.U.G.S, it was released on July 11, 2016 as the lead single from the former's ninth mixtape of the same name (2016). The official remix of the song by Charlie Heat was also included on the mixtape.

Music video
The song's music video, directed by Alex Bittan, was filmed in Los Angeles in September 2016. It premiered on November 7, 2016, via Ty Dolla Sign's official YouTube channel.

Charts

Release history

References

2016 singles
2016 songs
Ty Dolla Sign songs
Future (rapper) songs
Atlantic Records singles
Songs written by Ty Dolla Sign
Songs written by Future (rapper)